The London International College in London was an early attempt at international education, operating from 1867 to 1889. It enrolled secondary-school students from a number of countries in a programme aimed at fostering internationalist sentiments in its pupils. Its official name was the London College of the International Education Society, and it was also known as the Spring Grove School, from its location in the Spring Grove area of Isleworth, London.

History
The International Education Society was organized in 1863, primarily by Liberal politician and industrialist Richard Cobden, who hoped international education could help eliminate war and promote free trade (an idea that had been discussed by a number of like-minded individuals at the 1855 Paris Exposition). Cobden died before the school opened, but William Ellis provided funding to complete the school's construction. The College's buildings were completed in 1866, and it officially opened in 1867, with classicist Leonhard Schmitz as the first headmaster. It engaged in a number of other educational experiments besides the focus on internationalism: it eliminated corporal punishment, and instituted an unusually science-focused curriculum, developed with noted scientists Thomas Henry Huxley and John Tyndall on its board of directors. In addition, Latin and Greek instruction was delayed to a later age than was then common, and instead instruction in modern languages was emphasized.

The college enrolled 10 day students and 58 boarders in its first year, rising to 100 students by the 1880s, many of whom came from other countries. Student Maurice Hewlett would become one of school's notable students as he went on to become a famous author and poet. The school operated until 1889, when it was closed for unclear reasons, and the premises sold to Borough Road College. The ornately decorated main building survives and is noted in architectural guides. It was made a Grade II listed building in 2000.

Reregistered
Reregistered in 1974 and is currently at Kemp House, City Rd, London. London International college launched its website, www.londoninternational.org.uk and Facebook page to move into the era of social media.

References

Experimental schools
Educational institutions established in 1867
Educational institutions disestablished in 1889
School buildings completed in 1866
Defunct schools in the London Borough of Hounslow
1867 establishments in England
1889 disestablishments in England
Grade II listed buildings in the London Borough of Hounslow